Graham Taylor (1944–2017) was an English footballer and manager.

Graham Taylor may also refer to:

 G. P. Taylor (Graham Peter Taylor, born 1958), British novelist and part-time priest
 Graham Taylor (baseball) (born 1984), Major League Baseball player
 Graham Taylor (theologian) (1851–1938)
 Graham Taylor (footballer, born 1998), Scottish footballer
 Graham R. Taylor, American social reformer during the Progressive Era.

See also 
 Douglas Graham Taylor (1936–2009), politician in Saskatchewan, Canada
 Graeme Taylor (born 1954), British guitarist
 Graeme Taylor (footballer) (born 1942), Australian rules footballer for Footscray